Tash-e Sofla (also Romanized as Tāsh-e Soflá; also known as Tāsh-e Pā’īn) is a village in Kharqan Rural District, Bastam District, Shahrud County, Semnan Province, Iran. At the 2006 census, its population was 149, in 41 families.

References 

Populated places in Shahrud County
Qumis (region)